Roosevelt Hall may refer to:

Roosevelt Hall, the Norvelt Fireman's Hall, in Norvelt, Pennsylvania, named for Eleanor Roosevelt.
 Roosevelt Hall (1839), a Greek Revival mansion in Skaneateles, New York.
Roosevelt Hall, a community center in Barrett, Minnesota, constructed by the Civil Works Administration and on the National Register of Historic Places (NRHP). 
Roosevelt Hall, Eastern Washington Hospital, Medical Lake, Washington, on the NRHP.
Roosevelt Hall, at Brooklyn College, Brooklyn, New York.
Roosevelt Hall, at Hofstra University School of Law, Hempstead, New York.
Roosevelt Hall (1903-07), National War College, Fort McNair, Washington, DC, on the NRHP.
Roosevelt Hall, at Eastern Michigan University, former Roosevelt High School in Ypsilanti, Michigan

Architectural disambiguation pages